The Jamsil Railway Bridge crosses the Han River in South Korea and connects the districts of Gangbyeon Station and Jamsillaru Station. The bridge was completed in 1979.

References

Buildings and structures in Songpa District
Buildings and structures in Gwangjin District
Girder bridges
Road-rail bridges
Railway bridges in South Korea
Bridges in Seoul
Bridges over the Han River (Korea)
Bridges completed in 1979
Rapid transit bridges
Seoul Subway Line 2